Pamphylia Tanailidi, often spelled as Panfilia Tanailidi (1891, Bashkand – 15 October 1937, Baku) was an Azerbaijani actress of Pontic Greek origin.

Life and career
Tanailidi was born in the village of Bashkand (then Zangezur uyezd, Elisabethpol Governorate of Russia; nowadays the village of Mutsk, Syunik province, Armenia) to a family of émigrés from Kars. She first appeared on stage in 1905 as an Azeri drama trouper in Tiflis (the troupe was reorganized into the Azerbaijani Theatre of Tbilisi in 1922), where she acted in plays by Hajibeyov, Jabbarli, Shakespeare, etc. in both Azeri and Greek languages. At that time, Tanailidi was often credited as Surayya Zangasurskaya (Azeri: Sürəyya Zəngəzurskaya). In 1917, she toured Iran along with prominent Azeri actors of the time. Playing the part of Asya in Hajibeyov's Arshin Mal Alan musical comedy in 1919 brought her great success. In 1924, she settled in Baku and started working at the Azerbaijan State Academic National Drama Theatre. Later she starred in the movies Ismat (1934) and Almaz (1936).

Death
In 1937, Pamphylia Tanailidi was accused by the Soviet government of being an Iranian spy. Her close friendship with Govhar Gaziyeva (Azerbaijani actress and Tanailidi's co-trouper, who emigrated to Iran upon Azerbaijan's Sovietization in 1920) and Ahmed Trinić (an Albanian-born journalist, who was imprisoned in 1936 and committed suicide a year later) was considered enough evidence to condemn her of espionage. Tanailidi refused to plead guilty. After a fifteen-minute trial, she was given the death sentence, and on 15 October 1937 she was executed by firing squad. The location of her burial place remains unknown even today.

In 1957, Pamphylia Tanailidi was officially exonerated.

Roles
 Mehriban (Goveh the Blacksmith by S. Sami)
 Badi ul-Jamal (Seyfalmuluk by M.J. Amirov)
 Azerbai (Azerbai and Jan by I. Ashurbeyli)
 Shamsa (The Tripoli War by J. Jabbarli)
 Kabla Fatma (The Dead People by J. Mammadguluzadeh)
 Emilia (Othello by W. Shakespeare)
 Peasant woman (Timur the Lame by H. Javid)
 Aouda (Around the World in Eighty Days by J. Verne)
 Wise woman (Ismat by M. Mikayilov & G. Braginski)
 Fatmanisa (Almaz by J. Jabbarli)

Trivia
 Tanailidi was fluent in five languages: Pontic Greek, Azeri, Russian, Turkish, and Georgian.
 She was known as a heavy smoker. According to poet Suleyman Rustam, among many reasons that led to her arrest, there was her preference of Iranian tobacco over Soviet tobacco, which she disliked and called "garbage".

External links
 The History of Music of Azerbaijan in the 20th Century - The Totalitarian Era by Farah Aliyeva. An article in the Musiqi Dunyasi Magazine (in Azeri).

1891 births
1937 deaths
20th-century Azerbaijani actresses
Azerbaijani stage actresses
Azerbaijani film actresses
Soviet stage actresses
Soviet film actresses
Soviet rehabilitations
Great Purge victims from Azerbaijan
Soviet people of Greek descent
Azerbaijani people of Greek descent
Executed Azerbaijani women
People from Syunik Province
People from Elizavetpol Governorate